Allen Edward Atkinson (born July 28, 1943) is a former American football linebacker who played in the American Football League (AFL) and the National Football League (NFL). He played high school ball at Monsignor Bonner High School. He played college football at Villanova University, where he was a lineman.  He played professionally in the AFL for the New York Jets from 1965 through 1969; then for the NFL Jets 1970 through 1974.  He was a member of the Jets' 1968 World Championship team, and an American Football League All-Star in 1968.

See also
List of American Football League players

References

External links
 New York Jets bio page

1943 births
Living people
Players of American football from Philadelphia
American football linebackers
Villanova Wildcats football players
New York Jets players
American Football League players
American Football League All-Star players